The 1934 South Carolina gubernatorial election was held on November 6, 1934, to select the governor of the state of South Carolina. Olin D. Johnston won the contested Democratic primary and ran unopposed in the general election becoming the 98th governor of South Carolina.

Democratic primary
The South Carolina Democratic Party held their primary for governor in the summer of 1934 and it attracted many politicians because of the change in 1926 to the South Carolina constitution providing for a four-year term. Johnston emerged victorious from the runoff against former Governor Cole Blease and ran without opposition on account of South Carolina's effective status as a one-party state.

General election
The general election was held on November 6, 1934, and Olin D. Johnston was elected the next governor of South Carolina without opposition. Being a non-presidential election and few contested races, turnout was much lower than the Democratic primary election.

 

|-
| 
| colspan=5 |Democratic hold
|-

See also
Governor of South Carolina
List of governors of South Carolina
South Carolina gubernatorial elections

References

"Supplemental Report of the Secretary of State to the General Assembly of South Carolina." Reports of State Officers Boards and Committees to the General Assembly of the State of South Carolina. Volume I. Columbia, South Carolina: 1935, p. 3.

External links
SCIway Biography of Olin Dewitt Talmadge Johnston

1934 United States gubernatorial elections
1934
Gubernatorial